76 (seventy-six) is the natural number following 75 and preceding 77.

In mathematics
76 is:

 a Lucas number.
 a telephone or involution number, the number of different ways of connecting 6 points with pairwise connections.
 a nontotient.
 a 14-gonal number.
 a centered pentagonal number.
 an Erdős–Woods number since it is possible to find sequences of 76 consecutive integers such that each inner member shares a factor with either the first or the last member.
 an automorphic number in base 10. It is one of two 2-digit numbers whose square, 5,776, and higher powers, end in the same two digits.

There are 76 unique compact uniform hyperbolic honeycombs in the third dimension that are generated from Wythoff constructions.

In science
The atomic number of osmium.
The Little Dumbbell Nebula in the constellation Pegasus is designated as Messier object 76 (M76).

In other fields

Seventy-six is also:
In colloquial American parlance, reference to 1776, the year of the signing of the United States Declaration of Independence.
Seventy-Six, an 1823 novel by American writer John Neal.
The Spirit of '76, patriotic painting by Archibald MacNeal Willard.
A brand of ConocoPhillips gas stations, 76.
The number of trombonists leading the parade in "Seventy-Six Trombones," from Meredith Willson's musical The Music Man.
The 76ers, a professional basketball team based in Philadelphia.
 76, the debut album of Dutch trance producer and DJ Armin van Buuren.
 Years like 1876 and 1976

See also
 List of highways numbered 76

References

Integers